Phaeoxantha asperula is a species of tiger beetle in the subfamily Cicindelinae that was described by Westwood in 1852, and can be found in Argentina, Brazil, Paraguay, and Peru.

References

Beetles described in 1852
Beetles of South America